Real Deal is an American television series aired on the History channel which premiered in December 2011. The show brings together sellers of antiques, collectables and historical artifacts with professional buyers. The show is based on the UK TV show Dickinson's Real Deal, except the US show lacks the independent sellers and an on-screen host.

Format
It follows the "sellers" who try to pitch their items to the "dealers". The dealers will offer an amount after a brief evaluation of the item, based on their professional evaluation and years of experience. After debating on the price, the seller can accept the cash offer, or choose to go to auction and potentially lose money or exceed the dealer's offer. The auction is hosted at Don Presley's auction house in Anaheim, CA.

Season 1 (2011)
The first season had a wide variety of items presented to the dealers, including a restored gas pump, Native American artifacts, a collection of autographed footballs, an electroshock therapy unit, antique bicycles, a woolly mammoth tooth, comic books, a 1960s MK II Lincoln and a brass spitoon from a Nevada mine and brothel.  Some sellers took the cash offers, others opted to roll the dice and go to auction.  Many of the sellers ended up with a much smaller auction price, while others sold their items for a little to a lot more than the dealers' offer.

The Real Deal dealers bring a wide range of specialties to the show with them, and have decades of combined experience.  All enjoy their fields and have a loyal customer base.

The Dealers

The Auctioneer

Future
As of February 2012, the full episodes have been removed from History's website and no further episodes are planned to be aired. The show may have been canceled.

References

External links
Official website

2011 American television series debuts
2011 American television series endings
History (American TV channel) original programming
Auction television series
American television series based on British television series
Television series by Banijay